Igrinsky District (Egra joros) is an administrative and municipal district (raion), one of the twenty-five in the Udmurt Republic, Russia. It is located in the center of the republic. Its administrative center is the rural locality (a settlement) of Igra. Population:  42,850 (2002 Census);  The population of Igra accounts for 54.3% of the district's total population.

References

Notes

Sources

Districts of Udmurtia